Zaria Airport  is an airport serving Zaria, a city in the Kaduna State of Nigeria. Nigerian College of Aviation Technology NCAT is based on the grounds of the airport.
There is no scheduled airline operations at the airport. The airport is for training students to become pilots. It's institution of aviation technology which is a federal government that control the affair of the college of technology.

The Zaria non-directional beacon (Ident: ZA) is on the field.

History 

The Nigerian College of Aviation Technology Zaria was setup in 1964 with the responsibility of training pilots, Air traffic controller, Aircraft maintenance engineers, Aeronautical Telecommunication engineers, cabin crew, flight dispatchers and other aviation professional.

See also

Transport in Nigeria
List of airports in Nigeria

References

External links
OpenStreetMap - Zaria
OurAirports - Zaria
SkyVector - Zaria

Airports in Nigeria
Kaduna State
Zaria